These are the official results of the Men's Shot Put event at the 1993 IAAF World Championships in Stuttgart, Germany. There were a total number of 32 participating athletes, with the final held on Saturday August 21, 1993. The qualification mark was set at 20.00 metres.

Medalists

Schedule
All times are Central European Time (UTC+1)

Abbreviations
All results shown are in metres

Records

Qualification
 Held on Friday 1993-08-20

Final

See also
 1992 Men's Olympic Shot Put
 1993 Shot Put Year Ranking

References
 Results
 IAAF

s
Shot put at the World Athletics Championships